"Saku" (stylized 朔-saku-), meaning "New Moon", is the 19th single off the Withering to Death album by Dir En Grey released on July 14, 2004. It was nominated for best Music Video Award on MTV's Headbangers Ball in 2006, making it the first ever J-rock song to be nominated for the Award.

Track listing
All lyrics are written by Kyo; Music composed by Dir En Grey.

Personnel 
 Dir En Grey
 Kyo – vocals, lyricist
 Kaoru – guitar
 Die – guitar
 Toshiya – bass guitar
 Shinya – drums
 Hiroshi Tomioka - Executive producer

References 

2004 singles
2005 singles
Dir En Grey songs
Songs written by Kyo (musician)
2004 songs